Mosstodloch is a small village in Moray, Scotland, lying near the A96 between Fochabers and Elgin on the west bank of the River Spey.

The village was served by Balnacoul Halt railway station from 1893 to 1931.

Education
It has a primary school, Mosstodloch Primary School, which has 161 pupils. The school was built in 1968, and in February 2012, a campaign was underway to build a new school building. Its secondary pupils usually attend Milne's High School in Fochabers.

Current events
Construction work on a bypass for Mosstodloch and the neighbouring village of Fochabers, costing £31.5m, started in February 2010 and the Mosstodloch section opened on 27 September 2011. The Fochabers section opened in January 2012.  The project was significantly delayed due to conflict regarding the proposed route, and discovery of a Neolithic settlement on the site of the bypass, at Coul Brae, Mosstodloch.

The village also fields a team, Mosstodloch FC in the local welfare league.

References

Villages in Moray